Ryu Ji-Hye (Hangul: 류지혜, Hanja:  柳智恵) (born February 10, 1976 in Busan, South Korea) is a former female table tennis player from South Korea.

External links
profile
IOC profile

1976 births
Living people
South Korean female table tennis players
Table tennis players at the 1996 Summer Olympics
Table tennis players at the 2000 Summer Olympics
Olympic table tennis players of South Korea
Olympic bronze medalists for South Korea
Olympic medalists in table tennis
Medalists at the 2000 Summer Olympics
Medalists at the 1996 Summer Olympics
Universiade medalists in table tennis
Asian Games medalists in table tennis
Table tennis players at the 1994 Asian Games
Table tennis players at the 1998 Asian Games
Table tennis players at the 2002 Asian Games
Asian Games silver medalists for South Korea
Asian Games bronze medalists for South Korea
Medalists at the 1994 Asian Games
Medalists at the 1998 Asian Games
Medalists at the 2002 Asian Games
Universiade silver medalists for South Korea
Sportspeople from Busan